The Folklore Museum of Afytos is located in the seaside village of Afytos on the Kassandra peninsula of Chalkidiki, Central Macedonia, Greece.

History
The museum was established in the 1980s by Nikos Paralis and the local Folklore Association using artifacts donated by the villagers. The museum was housed in a traditional listed building dating to 1889 in the centre of the village, which was donated by the Aletras family.

Exhibits
The folklore collection includes domestic utensils, agricultural implements (for ploughing, sowing, reaping, harvesting), and pottery, which is a craft with a long tradition here. The folklore collection is accompanied by a collection of Karagiozis shadow-theatre puppets owned by the puppet-master Evgenios Spatharis.

Gallery

References

Citations

Sources
 

Afytos
Chalkidiki
1980s establishments in Greece